Patrick McLaughlin (1883 – 27 March 1916) was an English professional footballer who played as a centre forward in the Football League for Fulham. He had a long career in non-League football in North East England.

Personal life 
Prior to the First World War, McLaughlin worked as commissionaire at Palmer's Works in Jarrow. In August 1914, shortly after the outbreak of the First World War, McLaughlin enlisted in the Northumberland Fusiliers in Jarrow. By the end of the month, he had been promoted to acting sergeant and was posted to the Western Front in December 1914. McLaughlin was made a permanent sergeant in March 1915 and was wounded in July 1915. He was promoted to company sergeant major in February 1916. McLaughlin was killed by a sniper shortly after his unit had taken a German trench near Sint-Elooi, Belgium on the morning of 27 March 1916. He is commemorated on the Menin Gate.

Career statistics

References 

1883 births
1916 deaths
Sportspeople from Jarrow
English footballers
Association football forwards
Hebburn Argyle F.C. players
Chorley F.C. players
Blyth Spartans A.F.C. players
Gateshead A.F.C. players
Fulham F.C. players
Southend United F.C. players
English Football League players
Military personnel from County Durham
British Army personnel of World War I
Royal Northumberland Fusiliers soldiers
British military personnel killed in World War I
Deaths by firearm in Belgium
Footballers from Tyne and Wear